Mumtaz, also credited as Mumtaj, (born Nagma Khan) is an former Indian actress known primarily for her work in Tamil cinema. Besides Tamil films, She has also appeared in Hindi, Kannada, Malayalam and Telugu films. She entered the film industry through the Tamil film Monisha En Monalisa (1999) by T. Rajender and subsequently garnered popularity appearing in glamorous roles in films including Kushi (2000), Looty (2001) and Chocolate (2001). In 2018, she announced her retirement from the film industry.

Early life
Mumtaj completed her schooling at Mount. Mary's Convent School, Bandra  in Mumbai. As a teenage ardent film fan, she revealed that her room was full of posters featuring Sridevi, and when the school bus used to cross Filmistan Studios, she used to crane her neck out to catch a glimpse of the artistes.

Film career
Mumtaz's acting career began after she was spotted by film producer Sudhakar Bokade in a dance programme at Mount Mary School in Mumbai, when he subsequently offered to do a film with her, after he completed an ongoing project with Dilip Kumar titled Kalinga during 1996. As Kalinga faced delays, Bokade could not eventually start the film with Mumtaz, even though she had begun acting classes. During her stint at the acting course, she was recruited by veteran filmmaker Chetan Anand to work on his film produced by Bharat Shah, with Shah Rukh Khan in the lead role. For one and a half years, Mumtaz waited for the shoot to begin, before the project was shelved following Anand's death. Later in 1997, Tamil director T. Rajender signed Mumtaz to play the lead role of a pop singer in his romantic drama film, Monisha En Monalisa (1999). The film took two years to make owing to production troubles and Rajender's political activity, before opening to negative reviews from critics in April 1999.

Mumtaz then made an extended guest appearance in S. J. Surya's Kushi (2000), where she portrayed a glamorous college student alongside Vijay and Jyothika. Her performance in the song "Kattipudi Kattipudida" won her appreciation and further film offers, and as a result, Mumtaz was able to increase her appearance fee substantially. In her following projects, rather than her acting skills, her performances in song sequences won her appreciation and she regularly accepted to feature in item numbers. In the early 2000s, some of the more notable music videos shot on her included "Rasiga Rasiga" from Star (2001), "Malai Malai" from Chocolate (2001),"Missi Missi Papa" from Looty and "Subbamma Subbamma" from Roja Kootam (2002).

Despite the success of her song appearances, Mumtaz was keen to prolong her career in the film industry by selecting performance-oriented roles and subsequently announced her intentions of reducing one-song appearances. In 2003, she turned producer and financed the film Thathi Thavadhu Manasu, featuring her alongside rookie actresses Sona, Urvasi Patel and Sindhuri in the leading roles. The film was based around two real life incidents — the murder of a lawyer in bright daylight and the accident in which 40 individuals were killed. The film however performed poorly at the box office, with a critic writing "the movie's approach struggles between two completely opposite directions — a cheap, exploitative film and a tearjerker" and that "the producer seems to have banked on the film's glamour to bring in the viewers since that is what the title and the movie's promos focus on" and that "this is unfortunate because the main story has actually been taken quite well".

In the mid-2000s, she announced plans of a comeback in acting roles, and notably appeared in Jerry (2006) and T. Rajender's long-delayed Veerasamy. However, several of her other films during the period became stuck and eventually did not release, including projects such as Raviraja's Very Good, S. A. Chandrasekhar's Nenjankootill Neeye Nikkirai, Igore's Thik Thik Thik and the multi-starrer Vedakozhi. She has since seldom been seen in films, making a brief foray to play the antagonist in Rajadhi Raja (2009), before appearing in the Telugu films, Atharintiki Daaredi (2013) and Aagadu (2014) in glamorous roles.

Other work
Mumtaj was a judge in the first season of the reality dance competition Boys Vs Girls, which aired on Star Vijay, and season 6 of Maanada Mayilada, which aired on Kalaignar TV. She later took part as one of the contestants in the Tamil reality show, Bigg Boss Tamil 2 hosted by Kamal Haasan.

Filmography

Television

References

External links

Living people
21st-century Indian actresses
Actresses from Mumbai
Actresses in Hindi cinema
Actresses in Malayalam cinema
Actresses in Tamil cinema
Actresses in Telugu cinema
Tamil actresses
Indian film actresses
Female models from Mumbai
Bigg Boss (Tamil TV series) contestants
Actresses in Kannada cinema
Year of birth missing (living people)